Chuxiong Yi Autonomous Prefecture (Chuxiong Yi script: ，IPA: ; Yi script: ꊉꇑꆑꌠꑼꂰ; Yi Pinyin: wop lup nut su yuop mi) is an autonomous prefecture located in central Yunnan Province, China. The capital of the prefecture is Chuxiong City.

Subdivisions 
There is two county-level cities and eight counties.

Demographics 
According to the 2010 Census, Chuxiong Prefecture has 2,684,000 inhabitants, and according to the 2000 Census, Chuxiong Prefecture has 2,542,530 inhabitants with a population density of 86.91 inhabitants/km2.

Ethnic groups in Chuxiong, 2000 census

The Chuxiong Prefecture Almanac (1993:411) lists the following two ethnic Hani subgroups and their respective locations.
Woni (in Shuangbai County and Chuxiong City): Fabiao , Dazhuang , Yulong , Damaidi  of Shuangbai County
Luomian (in Wuding County): Nigagu 

The Bai language of Chuxiong is different from Bai of Dali, but the two are mutually intelligible nonetheless (Chuxiong Prefecture Almanac 1993:406)

Yi people

The Chuxiong Prefecture Ethnic Gazetteer (2013:361) lists the following 13 ethnic Yi subgroups and their respective autonyms (endonyms), exonyms, and demographic information.

References

External links
Official Chuxiong Yi Autonomous Prefecture website

 
Yi autonomous prefectures